Sonya Klopfer (married name: Dunfield, born December 26, 1934) is an American former competitive figure skater and coach. She is a two-time World medalist (bronze in 1951, silver in 1952) and the 1951 U.S. national champion.

Personal life 
Klopfer was born in New York City and was named after Sonja Henie. She married Canadian figure skater Peter Dunfield, with whom she had two sons.

Career 
Klopfer won silver on the senior level at the 1950 U.S. Championships. She was then sent to Wembley, England to compete at her first World Championships and finished fifth.

In 1951, Klopfer was awarded the gold medal at the U.S. Championships. Having won at age 15, she was the youngest U.S. senior ladies' champion until Tara Lipinski won in 1997 at age 14. Klopfer obtained the bronze medal in Milan at the 1951 World Championships, standing on the podium with Jeannette Altwegg and Jacqueline du Bief.

In February 1952, Klopfer competed at the Winter Olympics in Oslo, Norway and finished fourth at the event. Her final competition was the 1952 World Championships in Paris, France. She won silver behind du Bief and then retired from competition.

From the early 1960s, Klopfer coached with her husband in New York City at the Sky Rink. When the rink closed around 1983, they moved to the Gloucester Skating Club in Orleans, Ontario. Her students included Dorothy Hamill, Elizabeth Manley, Scott Smith, and Charlene Wong (from 1986 to 1990). She was inducted into the Skate Canada Hall of Fame in 2001 and into the Professional Skaters Association' Coaches Hall of Fame in 2005.

Results

References

 Skatabase: 1950s Worlds Ladies
 Skatabase: 1950s Olympic Ladies

Navigation

American female single skaters
Figure skaters at the 1952 Winter Olympics
Olympic figure skaters of the United States
American figure skating coaches
1934 births
Living people
World Figure Skating Championships medalists
Sportspeople from New York City
Female sports coaches
21st-century American women